World Trigger is a Japanese anime series based on the manga series of the same name written and illustrated by Daisuke Ashihara. During Jump Festa '21, it was announced that the series will receive a third season, with the second season airing for one cour (season). The third season aired from October 10, 2021 to January 23, 2022. On December 23, 2021, two additional episodes were announced for January 2022.


On September 28th, 2022 Toei announced via Twitter that the dubs of seasons two and three would start streaming on October 4th.

Episode list

Notes

References

World Trigger
2021 Japanese television seasons
2022 Japanese television seasons